Baron Auguste Creuzé de Lesser (3 October 1771 – 14 August 1839) was a French poet, playwright, librettist and politician.

Works 

1790: Satires de Juvenal, traduction en prose 
1796: Le Seau enlevé, poème héroï-comique, imitated from Tassoni, suivi d'un choix des stances les plus intéressantes de l'auteur italien et de quelques poésies
1806: Voyage en Italie et en Sicile, fait en 1801 et 1802 Text online at Gallica
1811: La Table ronde, poem
1812: Roland, poem
1813: Amadis de Gaule, poème, faisant suite à la Table ronde 
1814: El Cid, romances espagnoles imitées en romances françaises 
1825: Apologues
1831: Le Dernier Homme, poème imité de Grainville
1832: De la Liberté, ou Résumé de l'histoire des républiques
1834: Étrennes pour les enfants. Contes de fées mis en vers, imités de Perrault et autres 
1834: Annales secrètes d'une famille pendant 1800 ans mises au jour (2 volumes)
1835: Les Véritables Lettres d'Héloïse, in verse
1837: Le Roman des romans (2 volumes)
1839: La Chevalerie, ou les Histoires du Moyen Âge, composées de La Table ronde, Amadis, Roland, poèmes sur les trois grandes familles de la chevalerie romanesque
1839: Le Naufrage et le Désert

Theatre and opera
1794: Les Voleurs, tragedy in five acts in prose after Friedrich von Schiller 
1798: Les Français à Cythère, comedy in 1 act in prose, mingled with vaudevilles, with René-André-Polydore Alissan de Chazet and Emmanuel Dupaty, Théâtre du Vaudeville, 17 March
1799: Ninon de Lenclos, ou l'Épicuréisme, comédie en vaudeville in 1 act and in prose, Théâtre des Troubadours, 2 September
1799: La Clef forée, ou la Première Représentation, anecdote en vaudevilles in 1 act, with François-Pierre-Auguste Léger, Théâtre des Troubadours, 17 October
1806: Monsieur Deschalumeaux ou la Soirée de carnaval, opéra bouffon in three acts, music by Pierre Gaveaux, Opéra-Comique, 17 February
1806: Le Déjeuner de garçons, comedy mingled with music, Théâtre Feydeau, 24 April
1807: L'Amante sans le savoir, one-act opéra comique, music by Jean-Pierre Solié, Théâtre Feydeau
1809: Le Secret du ménage, comedy in 3 acts and in verse, Théâtre-Français, 25 May Text online
1809: La Revanche, three-act comedy, with François Roger, Comédie-Française, 15 July
1809: Le Diable à quatre, ou la Femme acariâtre, three-act opéra comique, after Michel-Jean Sedaine, music by Jean-Pierre Solié, Théâtre Feydeau, 30 November
1810: Le Présent de noces, ou le Pari, one-act opéra comique, music by Henri François Berton, Théâtre Feydeau, 2 January
1801: Les Deux Espiègles, one-act comédie en vaudeville, with François Roger, Théâtre du Vaudeville, 8 January
1811: Le Magicien sans magie, two-act opéra comique, with François Roger, Opéra-Comique, 4 November
1811: Ninette à la cour, opéra comique in 2 acts and in verse, after Charles-Simon Favart, music by Henri Montan Berton, Opéra-Comique, 24 December
1811: Le Billet de loterie, one-act comedy, mingled with ariettes, with François Roger, music by Nicolas Isouard, Opéra-Comique, 14 September
1813: Le Nouveau Seigneur de village, one-act opéra comique, with Edmond de Favières, music by François-Adrien Boieldieu, Opéra-Comique, 29 June
1813: Mlle de Launay à la Bastille, one-act historical comedy, mingled with ariettes, with François Roger, Opéra-Comique, 16 December
1932: Le Prince et la Grisette, comedy in 3 acts and in verse, Paris, Théâtre-Français, 11 January

See also

References

Sources 
Anonyme, Répertoire général du Théâtre-Français, composé des tragédies, comédies et drames des auteurs du premier et du second ordre, restés au Théâtre-Français, H. Nicolle, Paris, vol. XXIV, 1817, (p. 113).
Ferdinand Hoefer, Nouvelle Biographie générale, Firmin-Didot, Paris, vol. XII, 1855, col. 453-454.
Pierre Larousse, Grand Dictionnaire universel du XIXe, vol. V, 1869, (p. 510).
Frédéric Godefroy, Histoire de la littérature française depuis le XVIe jusqu'à nos jours, vol. VII, XIXe, poètes, t. I, 1878, (p. 16-19).

External links 
 Auguste Creuzé de Lesser on 

1771 births
1839 deaths
Writers from Paris
Barons of France
Members of the Corps législatif
19th-century French poets
19th-century French dramatists and playwrights
French opera librettists